The 2001 Mnet Music Video Festival (MMF) was the third of the annual music awards in Seoul, South Korea that took place on November 23, 2001, at the Little Angels Arts Center.

Leading the nominees was Wax with three nominations. By the end of the ceremony, Wax was the only one to receive multiple awards, which is 2 out of her three nominations.

Background
The award-giving body continued to use the name "M.net Korean Music Festival" (MKMF) for the third time. It was also the third time for the event to take place at the Little Angels Arts Center, Seoul, South Korea. On the other hand, Cha Tae-hyun hosted the event for two consecutive times already. The grand awards (or daesang) were still the Best Popular Music Video and Music Video of the Year, without the nominees.

Nomination process
During the initial screening, fans added their candidates through the award's website www.mnet27.com. Then, the Mnet producers and the Nominee Selection Committee chose for the nominees. The official website was opened to the voters from Korea and Japan afterwards. In addition, professional judges have also chosen from the nominees. The votes from the fans and the judges were combined for the winners of each category.

Winners and nominees
Winners are listed first and highlighted in boldface.

Special awards
 Asian Viewer's Request Award: NRG – "Sorrow" (비)
 Achievement Award: Clon

Multiple awards

Artist(s) with multiple wins
The following artist(s) received two or more wins (excluding the special awards):

Artist(s) with multiple nominations
The following artist(s) received two or more nominations:

Performers and presenters
The following individuals and groups, listed in order of appearance, presented awards or performed musical numbers.

Performers

Presenters

Notes

References

External links
 Mnet Asian Music Awards  official website

MAMA Awards ceremonies
Mnet Music Video Festival
Mnet Music Video Festival
Mnet Music Video Festival
Mnet Music Video Festival, 2001